"Ain't Nobody" is a song by American funk band Rufus and American singer Chaka Khan. It was released on November 4, 1983, as one of four studio tracks included on their live album, Stompin' at the Savoy (1983). "Ain't Nobody" quickly gathered popularity, and reached number one on the US Billboard R&B chart and number 22 on the US Billboard Hot 100. It has become one of Khan's signature songs.

Rufus keyboardist David "Hawk" Wolinski wrote the song around a repeating synthesizer loop backed by a Linn LM-1 drum computer; however, John "JR" Robinson, the band's drummer, played real drums for the recording session. The band held a democratic vote, and they decided to include the song in their album repertoire. Once the song was recorded, Warner executives wanted to issue another song as the album's first single. Wolinski threatened to give the song to singer Michael Jackson and producer Quincy Jones for Jackson's album Thriller if the song was not the lead-off single. The label relented and "Ain't Nobody" was issued and hit number one on the R&B chart for the week ending October 15, 1983.

The song was included on the soundtrack album to the 1984 film Breakin'. In 2021, "Ain't Nobody" was ranked number 403 on Rolling Stones 500 Greatest Songs of All Time. The song was adopted in the United Kingdom by fans of some of the country's football clubs, with the words: Ain't nobody loves (player), makes me happy, makes me feel this way.

Composition
The song is performed in the key of E minor with a tempo of 104 beats per minute in common time. The bass synth intro however is in 9/8. Khan's vocals span from G3 to E5 in the song.

Charts and certifications

Weekly charts

Year-end charts

Certifications

Jaki Graham version

In 1994, British singer-songwriter Jaki Graham released her cover of "Ain't Nobody". It was released as the first and lead single from her fourth and last album, Real Life (1994). Graham's version reached number one on the US Billboard Hot Dance Club Play chart for five weeks as well as being in the Top 5 favourite videos for BET (Black Entertainment Charts). The single also reached number 44 in the UK, number 11 in Iceland and number 17 in Australia.

Critical reception
Larry Flick from Billboard called the song "smashing", and stated that Graham "returns with a grand reading of a Rufus pop/soulnugget. Track is the latest in an onslaught of competitive versions of the song by various divas. This one, however, is the real deal, thanks to Graham's considerable charm as well as a plethora of mixes that range from peppy NRG to muscular house. A sure-fire club hit, don't be surprised if crossover radio beckons." English newspaper Reading Evening Post commented, "This is one of those covers that doesn't really improve on the original. But the Chaka Khan song is a soul classic and Jaki Graham gives it a good shot, even if her voice doesn't seem quite powerful enough for its bitter-sweet melodrama. A hard one not to sing along with."

Music video
The accompanying music video for "Ain't Nobody" was directed by American film director and producer Antoine Fuqua.

Track listings

Charts

Weekly charts

Year-end charts

Diana King version

In 1995, Jamaican singer-songwriter Diana King recorded a cover single of "Ain't Nobody", released as the third single from their debut album, Tougher Than Love (1995). It peaked at number 95 on the Billboard Hot 100, number four on the Billboard Hot Dance Club Play chart and number 13 on the UK Singles Chart.

Critical reception
Larry Flick from Billboard complimented the song as a "sexy hip hop interpretation" and "irresistible", complimenting King's "assured performance". M.R. Martinez from Cash Box described it as a "bumpin' cover". James Masterton for Dotmusic said, "Now it is the turn of Diana King's soft reggaefied version to crash into the charts, give [King] another hit and prolong the life of a quite brilliant pop song." Pan-European magazine Music & Media noted that the follow-up to "Shy Guy" sees the Jamaican vocalist "lose some of [King's] rough dancehall edges in favour of a smoother R&B sound", adding that the chorus is "pure, uplifting modern soul." A reviewer from Music Week rated it three out of five, writing, "A fairly standard cover of the Chaka Khan classic, with strong production. [King] might just convert some more fans." Ralph Tee from the magazine's RM Dance Update stated, "'Shy Guy' turned out to be an international smash and this follow-up has similar crossover opportunities."

Music video
A music video was produced to promote the single, directed by American film, television, commercial and music video director Kevin Bray. It was later published on King's official YouTube channel in October 2009. The video has amassed more than two million views as of May 2021.

Track listings

Charts

LL Cool J remix

Rapper LL Cool J recorded an interpolation of the song for the soundtrack to the 1996 film Beavis and Butt-Head Do America, based on the adult animated series Beavis and Butt-Head. Released as the soundtrack's second single, the song peaked at number 46 on the Billboard Hot 100, number four on the Hot Rap Singles Chart and number 27 on the Billboard Hot R&B/Hip-Hop Songs chart. Outside of the United States, the song topped the charts in the United Kingdom, where the song was also a hit for Gwen Dickey and KWS (reaching number 21) and The Course (number eight).

Critical reception
Larry Flick from Billboard described LL Cool J's version as a "pop juiced hip-hop ditty." He added, "The rap vet playfully unfurls his patented love-talk on top of an insinuating classic-funk bassline. The hip-grinding verses lead to a chantable chorus that re-creates the best portions of the timeless Rufus nugget [..]. Programmers starved for something sexy and immediately appealing need look no further." Alan Jones from Music Week felt that "LL Cool J's comeback with Ain't Nobody is more workmanlike than inspired, with all the lyrical dexterity we expect from him." He noted that "it includes an un-named femme who takes over to sing the chorus though this simply draws attention to what a good vocalist Chaka Khan is. A surefire hit, and quite a big one at that, though not one of LL's best."

Music video
The accompanying music video of this version, directed by Michael Martin, produced by Jonathan Heuer, and cinematography by Martin Coppen, was partially filmed at Mount Hood of Oregon. It also shows a pool party filled with guests, including Maia Campbell, Brian McKnight, Alfonso Ribeiro, Cedric the Entertainer, John Salley, and John Witherspoon.

Charts

Richard X vs. Liberty X version

In 2003, English-Irish pop group Liberty X released a version of the song titled "Being Nobody", produced by Richard X, as the lead single from Richard X's debut studio album, Richard X Presents His X-Factor Vol. 1 (2003), as well as the lead single from Liberty X's second studio album, Being Somebody (2003). The song is a pseudo-mashup, taking the lyrics of "Ain't Nobody" and placing them over an instrumental interpolation of the Human League's "Being Boiled". Additional elements from both songs were also used such as the recurring synth line from "Ain't Nobody" and the line "OK, ready? Let's do it." in the intro of the main mix are from the intro of "Being Boiled".

Liberty X first performed "Being Nobody" on Ant & Dec's Saturday Night Takeaway on February 8, 2003. They also performed it twice on Top of the Pops, with other performances on The National Lottery Wright Ticket and CD:UK before officially released on March 17, 2003. Shortly after that, the 2003 remastered version of the original 1983 hit "Ain't Nobody" was released in April of that year.

Critical reception
The song received mostly positive reviews from music critics. It was deemed "instantly memorable" by RTÉ.ie reviewer Linda McGee, whilst Louis Pattison of NME believed it was "Truly, a record to get over-excited about." Alexis Kirke of musicOMH said: "The marriage of the credible dance-bootleg production of Richard X with high profile pop-act Liberty X is not only a perfect career-expanding synergy for both, but also a powerful musical synergy in which the seventies meets the eighties during the noughties." Writing for ukmix.org, Martin P gave the song five stars out of five and called it "It's pure pop perfection with a twist of R&B – one of the best Liberty X singles!"

Track listing
 "Being Nobody" (Main Mix) – 3:37
 "Being Nobody" (Richard X Remix) – 4:25
 "Being Nobody" (X-Strumental) – 3:38

Charts

Weekly charts

Year-end charts

Scooter version

"It's a Biz (Ain't Nobody)" is a single by German hard dance band Scooter. It was released on March 23, 2012, as the fifth single from their fifteenth studio album, The Big Mash Up (2011).

Track listings
CD single (2-track)

Download

Charts

Felix Jaehn version

In 2015, German music producer and DJ Felix Jaehn released a remix titled "Ain't Nobody (Loves Me Better)" featuring vocals by British singer Jasmine Thompson. It is the lead single for his eponymous 2016 debut EP, Felix Jaehn. The remix was based on a solo release of the song by Thompson in 2013, when Thompson was 13, which had peaked at number 32 on the UK Singles Chart. However, the Felix Jaehn remix became a far bigger international chart success, peaking at number one or two in a number of European countries (including number two in the United Kingdom) as well as the top 10 in other European countries and Australia.

Track listing
"Ain't Nobody (Loves Me Better)"  – 3:01
"I Do"  – 3:02

Charts

Certifications

See also
List of Airplay 100 number ones of the 2010s
 List of number-one R&B singles of 1983 (U.S.)
 List of UK top 10 singles in 1984
 List of UK top 10 singles in 1989
 List of number-one dance singles of 1994 (U.S.)
 List of UK Singles Chart number ones of 1997
 List of UK top 10 singles in 2015
 Mashup (music)
 Of the Night – by Bastille
 Rhythm Is a Dancer
 The Rhythm of the Night

References

1983 songs
1983 singles
1994 singles
1995 singles
1996 singles
1997 singles
2003 singles
2012 singles
2015 singles
Chaka Khan songs
Diana King songs
Felix Jaehn songs
Liberty X songs
LL Cool J songs
KWS (band) songs
Jasmine Thompson songs
Delilah (musician) songs
Scooter (band) songs
Dutch Top 40 number-one singles
UK Singles Chart number-one singles
Number-one singles in Austria
Number-one singles in Germany
Number-one singles in Israel
Number-one singles in Poland
Number-one singles in Romania
Songs written by Hawk Wolinski
Song recordings produced by Russ Titelman
Song recordings produced by Richard X
Warner Records singles
Avex Group singles
Festival Records singles
Columbia Records singles
Polydor Records singles
Pulse 8 singles
Island Records singles
Sony Music singles
Geffen Records singles
Virgin Records singles
Tropical house songs
Synth-pop songs
Music videos directed by Antoine Fuqua
Music videos directed by Kevin Bray (director)